This article details the Barrow Raiders rugby league football club's 2019 season.

Fixtures and results

2019 Championship

References 

Barrow Raiders
Barrow Raiders
English rugby league club seasons